Poggio Chiesanuova is a village (curazia) located in San Marino. It belongs to the municipality (castello) of Chiesanuova.

Geography
The village is situated in the northern suburb of Chiesanuova, on the road to Acquaviva.

Sport
Close to Poggio is located the Chiesanuova Stadium, home ground of the S.S. Pennarossa (football), the Rugby Club San Marino and the San Marino national rugby union team.

See also
Chiesanuova
Caladino
Confine
Galavotto
Molarini
Poggio Casalino
Teglio

Curazie in San Marino
Chiesanuova